Russia has participated in the Eurovision Song Contest 23 times since their debut in . Russia won the  contest with Dima Bilan performing the song "Believe". In , they failed to qualify for the final for the first time in their history. The Russian entry has been chosen through both internal selections and a televised national final titled Evrovidenie, with their most recent entry being chosen by the latter.

Following their exclusion from the  due to the 2022 Russian invasion of Ukraine, on 26 February 2022, the Russian broadcasters VGTRK and Channel One announced that they would suspend their membership in the European Broadcasting Union (EBU). The suspension was made effective by the EBU on 26 May, preventing Russia from participating in further Eurovision events unless their membership is resumed.

Contest history
Russia debuted in the  contest after becoming a member of the EBU.

Russia has failed to qualify for the final on two occasions. In 1996, Russia's entry was Andrey Kosinsky with the song "Ya eto ya", but he scored an insufficient number of points in a special qualifying round, while in 2018 Yulia Samoylova, who represented the country with the song "I Won't Break", failed to qualify from the televised second semi-final.

In 1998, because Russia did not participate in the contest (due to lower average scores in participating in previous competitions), Russia refused to broadcast the competition and the European Broadcasting Union in return forbade the country to participate the following year. According to unconfirmed information, Russia intended to send Tatyana Ovsienko with the song "Solntse moyo" (My Sun), which turned out to be a false rumour as the song was officially released in mid-1997 on Tatyana's album "Za Rozovym morem". Tatyana herself, during an interview, said that she did not go to Eurovision because she was "Either afraid or not very sure, besides, i knew that there were stronger guys and girls, and I thought that i would still have time [to go to Eurovision]."

Russia won their first and so far only contest in 2008, when Dima Bilan, participating for the second time in the contest, won with the song "Believe", bringing the contest to Russia for 2009.

Russia was the most successful country in Eurovision between 2000 and 2009, with one win, two-second places, and two third places. However, in 2010 they finished 11th, and in 2011 they were 16th, which was the worst placing for Russia since 1995. Interest in the competition fell, but in 2012, Buranovskiye Babushki finished in second place, increasing Russia's interest in the show. Russia holds the record for the most top five finishes in the 21st century, with ten, with Sergey Lazarev holding the record of the highest score of any Russian contestant, who finished third in 2016 with 491 points.

In February 2019, Sergey Lazarev was once again confirmed as the Russian representative for the 2019 contest, becoming the second returning artist in Russia's Eurovision history after Dima Bilan, who participated in 2006 and 2008 respectively. This time he represented his country with the song "Scream", with which he brought Russia back to the final for the first time since 2016 and achieved the country's 10th top 5 result, by finishing third once again.

For the 2021 contest, Russia opted to return to a national selection, after Little Big declined to return following their intended participation in the later-cancelled 2020 contest with "Uno". "Russian Woman" performed by Manizha emerged as the winner of the selection, which then went on to finish in 9th place in the final.

Russia had originally planned to participate in the  contest, but was excluded from participating by the EBU due to the 2022 Russian invasion of Ukraine. In response, the Russian broadcasters VGTRK and Channel One announced their intention to suspend their membership in the EBU. The suspension was made effective by the EBU on 26 May, preventing Russia from participating in further Eurovision events unless their membership is resumed.

Broadcast
The contest has been broadcast irregularly on two different public state channels in Russia, both EBU members: in 1994 and 1996 it was broadcast on Russia-1 of VGTRK, while in 1995, 1997 and from 1999 to 2007 the contest was broadcast on Channel One. Since 2008, there is an alternation on broadcast and selection duties, with Russia-1 on even years, and Channel One on odd years. This alternation was disrupted when Russia withdrew from the 2017 contest, after which Channel One assumed broadcast and selection duties in 2018, 2020 and 2021, and Russia-1 in 2019.

Participation overview

Related involvement

Conductors

Heads of delegation

Commentators and spokespersons

Costume designers

Viewing figures

Hostings

Awards

Marcel Bezençon Awards

Barbara Dex Award

Photogallery

See also
Russia in the Junior Eurovision Song Contest – Junior version of the Eurovision Song Contest.
Russia in the Eurovision Dance Contest – Dance version of the Eurovision Song Contest.
Russia in the Eurovision Young Dancers – A competition organised by the EBU for younger dancers aged between 16 and 21.
Russia in the Eurovision Young Musicians – A competition organised by the EBU for musicians aged 18 years and younger.
Russia in the Türkvizyon Song Contest – A contest for countries and regions which are of Turkic-speaking or Turkic ethnicity.

Notes and references

Notes

References

 
Countries in the Eurovision Song Contest